Mbugua Martin Kimani (born 1971) is a Kenyan government official and diplomat. He has served as Kenya's Permanent Representative to the United Nations since December 2020. He previously served as the Director of the National Counter Terrorism Centre and as a Special Envoy for Countering Violent Extremism in Kenya.

Early life 
Kimani was born in 1971 in Mombasa.

Kimani has a bachelor's degree from the University of New Hampshire (1996). He has a master's degree (2003) and a PhD (2013) in War Studies from King's College London, University of London.

He wrote his master's thesis on oil marketing in Kenya. His PhD thesis was about the role of Christian symbolism, the Catholic Church, and racialism in the 1994 Rwandan genocide.

Career

Previous roles 
Kimani has worked in Nairobi, Addis Ababa, and New York City and has been employed by the United Nations Human Settlements Programme and the United Nations Environment Programme.

He was an Associate Fellow at the Conflict, Security & Development Group at King’s College London.

From April 2011 to December 2012, Kimani was the Director of the Intergovernmental Authority on Development Conflict Early Warning and Response Mechanism in Ethiopia.

Current roles 
Kimani is the Kenyan Presidential Special Envoy for Countering Violent Extremism, and was appointed as the Director of Kenya's National Counter Terrorism Centre in 2015.

He became the secretary for the Building Bridges Initiative in December 2018.

Kimani is Kenya's Permanent Representative to the United Nations and has been in that post since December 2020. He was president of the United Nations Security Council for October 2021.

22 February 2022 speech 
Kimani delivered a speech to the UN Security Council on 22 February 2022, in which he criticised Russia's recognition of separatist-held areas of Ukraine, and drew comparisons between the borders of Europe and those of Africa, saying:"This situation echoes our history. Kenya and almost every African country was birthed by the ending of empire. Our borders were not of our own drawing (...). Today, across the border of every single African country, live our countrymen with whom we share deep (...) bonds. At independence, had we chosen to pursue states at the basis of ethnic, racial or religious homogeneity, we would still be waging bloody wars these many decades later. Instead, we agreed that we would settle on the borders that we inherited (...), rather than form nations that looked ever backward into history with a dangerous nostalgia, we chose to look forward (...). We believe that all states formed from empires that have collapsed or retreated, have many peoples in them yearning for integration with peoples in neighbouring states. This is normal and understandable. (...) However, Kenya rejects such a yearning from being pursued by force (...). We rejected irredentism and expansionism on any basis (...), we reject it again today."The speech went viral on social media.

Writing 
Kimani's writing has been published in Chimurenga, Farafina, Granta, Juxtapoz, Kwani, Süddeutsche Zeitung, and The East African, and The Guardian.

His book The Work of War was published by Granta Books online.

Awards and fellowships 
Kimani was awarded the honour of Elder of the Order of the Burning Spear by the President of Kenya in 2016.

Kimani is a Fellow of the Aspen Global Leadership Network and of the Africa Leadership Initiative.

In 2013, Kimani was a Distinguished African Visiting Fellow at the South African Institute of International Affairs.

Family life 
Kimani and his wife June Arunga Kimani have two children.

See also 

 Presidency of the United Nations Security Council
 2021–2022 Russo-Ukrainian crisis

References

External links
 Kimani's articles in The Guardian
 

1971 births
Living people
Alumni of King's College London
21st-century Kenyan writers
Kenyan diplomats
Kenyan male writers
Kenyan non-fiction writers
People from Mombasa
Permanent Representatives of Kenya to the United Nations
University of New Hampshire alumni